"När ingen ser" is a song recorded by Swedish singer Axel Schylström. The song was released as a digital download in Sweden on 26 February 2017 and peaked at number 41 on the Swedish Singles Chart. It took part in Melodifestivalen 2017, and qualified to andra chansen from the fourth semi-final on 25 February 2017. It was written by Behshad Ashnai, Schylström and David Strääf.

Track listing

Chart performance

Weekly charts

Release history

References

2017 singles
2016 songs
Swedish-language songs
Melodifestivalen songs of 2017
Swedish pop songs
Songs written by Axel Schylström